Anders Grimberg is a Swedish football manager and former player who played as a forward. He played one match for Malmö FF in 1980. Grimberg later became a manager.

References

External links 
 Anders Grimberg at Soccerway
 Anders Grimberg manager stats

1960 births
Living people
Association football forwards
Swedish footballers
Allsvenskan players
Malmö FF players
Swedish football managers
IFK Malmö Fotboll managers
Trelleborgs FF managers
FC Rosengård 1917 managers